The following lists events that happened during 1954 in South Africa.

Incumbents
 Monarch: Queen Elizabeth II.
 Governor-General and High Commissioner for Southern Africa: Ernest George Jansen.
 Prime Minister: Daniel François Malan (until 30 November), Johannes Gerhardus Strijdom (starting 30 November).
 Chief Justice: Albert van der Sandt Centlivres.

Events

January
 Mimi Coertse starts tutorship under Maria Hittorff and Josef Witt.

April
 17 – The Federation of South African Women is launched in Johannesburg.
 23 – The Afrikaans-German Culture Union (Afrikaanse-Deutsche Kultuurgemeinschaft - ADK) is founded in Pretoria.

June
 23 – The Trust Bank of South Africa is founded by Jan S. Marais.

September
 14 – Sasolburg is established near the Sasol plant in the northern Orange Free State.

October
 10 – The much-travelled statue of Paul Kruger is unveiled in Church Square, Pretoria by Dr. D.F. Malan.
 11 – Daniel François Malan announces his retirement.

November
 30 – Johannes Gerhardus Strijdom becomes the 6th Prime Minister of South Africa.

December
 16–19 – The 43rd Annual Conference of the African National Congress is held in Durban.

Unknown date
 George Bizos is admitted as a lawyer to the South African Bar.

Births
 13 January – Trevor Rabin, South African–American musician, founder member of Rabbitt.
 2 May – Bulelani Ngcuka, first national director of the National Prosecuting Authority.
 10 May – Lindiwe Sisulu, member of Parliament of South Africa, national minister.
 10 June – Nelson Dladla, Teenage Dladla, soccer player.
 23 August – Ngconde Balfour, politician.
 23 September – Mavis Davies, Local Politician and longest serving Councilor in the history of Mtubatuba Local Municipality 
 12 October – Duma Ndlovu, filmmaker, poet, playwright. Well known for creating Muvhango & Uzalo TV shows.
 5 November – Koos Kombuis, poet, singer, entertainer and writer.
 26 November – John Matshikiza, actor, theatre director, poet and journalist. (d. 2008)
 21 December – Gysie Pienaar, rugby player & father of rugby player Ruan Pienaar

Deaths

Railways

Locomotives
Two new Cape gauge steam locomotive types enter service on the South African Railways (SAR).
 The first of 120 Class GMA branch line and Class GMAM mainline 4-8-2+2-8-4 "Double Mountain" Garratt articulated locomotives.
 Twenty-five Class GO 4-8-2+2-8-4 "Double Mountain" light branch line Garratt locomotives.

Sports

Football
 1 May – The South Africa national football team beats the Israel national football team 2–1 at the Rand Stadium, Johannesburg in a friendly match.

References

History of South Africa